Dobroń  is a village in Pabianice County, Łódź Voivodeship, in central Poland. It is the seat of the gmina (administrative district) called Gmina Dobroń.

The village has a population of 1,210.

References

Villages in Pabianice County